Agelasta pardalina is a species of beetle in the family Cerambycidae. It was described by Heller in 1924. It is known from the Philippines.

Subspecies
 Agelasta pardalina pardalina Heller, 1924
 Agelasta pardalina subana Heller, 1924

References

pardalina
Beetles described in 1924